Leptostraca (from the Greek words for thin and shell) is an order of small, marine crustaceans. Its members, including the well-studied Nebalia, occur throughout the world's oceans and are usually considered to be filter-feeders. It is the only extant order in the subclass Phyllocarida. They are believed to represent the most primitive members of their class, the Malacostraca, and first appear in the fossil record during the Cambrian period.

Description

Their head has stalked compound eyes, two pairs of antennae (one biramous, one uniramous), and a pair of mandibles but no maxillipeds. The carapace is large and comprises two valves which cover the head and the thorax, including most of the thoracic appendages, and serves as a brood pouch for the developing embryos. The first six abdominal segments bear pleopods, while the seventh bears a pair of caudal furcae, which may be homologous to uropods of other crustaceans.

Leptostracans have gills on their thoracic limbs, but also breathe through a respiratory membrane on the inside of the carapace. The eggs hatch as a postlarval, or "manca" stage, which lacks a fully developed carapace, but otherwise resembles the adult.

Classification
It is now accepted that leptostracans belong to the Malacostraca, and the sister crown group to Leptostraca is Eumalacostraca.

The Order Leptostraca is divided into three families, with ten genera containing a total of around 40 validly described extant species:

References

External links

 
Crustacean orders
Malacostraca
Cambrian first appearances
Prehistoric arthropod orders